Stéphane Houdet and Stefan Olsson defeated Maikel Scheffers and Ronald Vink in the final, 6–4, 4–6, 6–4 to win the men's doubles wheelchair tennis title at the 2009 US Open.

Shingo Kunieda and Satoshi Saida were the reigning champions from when the event was last held in 2007, but Saida did not participate. Kunieda partnered Robin Ammerlaan, but was defeated by Houdet and Olsson in the semifinals.

The event was not held in 2008 due to a schedule conflict with the 2008 Summer Paralympics, an issue that would continue to affect US Open wheelchair tennis until 2021.

Seeds

 Stéphane Houdet /  Stefan Olsson (champions)
 Maikel Scheffers /  Ronald Vink (final)

Doubles

Finals

External links
Main Draw

Wheelchair Men's Doubles
U.S. Open, 2009 Men's Doubles